Two Mexican stations bear the callsign XHFA:

XHFA-FM 89.3, "La Poderosa" in Chihuahua, Chihuahua
XHFA-TDT virtual channel 2 (RF 15) in Nogales, Sonora, transmitter for Azteca Trece